Yukiko Okamoto may refer to:

, Japanese actress
, Japanese female distance runner